Kirill Sergeyevich Makeyev (born 18 May 1998) is a Russian football player. He plays for Irtysh Omsk.

Club career
He made his debut in the Russian Football National League for FC Zenit-2 Saint Petersburg on 17 July 2018 in a game against FC Tambov.

References

External links
 Profile by Russian Football National League

1998 births
Footballers from Saint Petersburg
Living people
Russian footballers
Russian expatriate footballers
Association football forwards
FC Zenit-2 Saint Petersburg players
BFC Daugavpils players
FC Irtysh Omsk players
Russian First League players
Russian Second League players
Latvian Higher League players
Russian expatriate sportspeople in Latvia
Expatriate footballers in Latvia
FC Zenit Saint Petersburg players